The 1967 Major League Baseball All-Star Game was the 38th midseason exhibition between the all-stars of the American League (AL) and the National League (NL), the two leagues comprising Major League Baseball. The game was played on July 11, 1967, at Anaheim Stadium in Anaheim, California. The game resulted in a 2–1 15 inning victory for the NL.  It set the record for the longest All-Star Game by innings, matched in 2008.

National League roster 
Fifteen coaches and players, denoted in italics, would be inducted into the Baseball Hall of Fame.

Pitchers

Position players

Coaching staff

American League roster 
Nine players, denoted in italics, would be inducted into the Baseball Hall of Fame.

Pitchers

Position players

Coaching staff 

(R) denotes a rookie player

Starting lineups 
The batting order was determined by each team's manager.

Umpires

Scoring summary 

The NL scored first when Dick Allen, the lead off batter in the top of the second inning, hit a home run off of AL pitcher Dean Chance.

The AL tied the score in the bottom of the sixth inning.  With one out, Brooks Robinson hit a home run off of NL relief pitcher Ferguson Jenkins.  The score remained unchanged through the ninth inning, forcing the game into extra innings.
In the top of the 15th inning, Tony Pérez hit a one-out home run off of AL pitcher Catfish Hunter, then in his fifth inning of relief, to give the NL a lead it would not relinquish.

Game notes and records 
Rod Carew became the first (and as of 2008, only) rookie second baseman to start an All-Star Game.

The two teams' pitching staffs combined for 30 strikeouts.  Until 2008, this would be the All-Star Game record for most combined strikeouts in a single game.  Each of the 12 pitchers used by both leagues had at least one strikeout with Ferguson Jenkins leading the way with six strikeouts in three innings of work.

One year after becoming the first African-American  umpire in Major League history, Emmett Ashford became the first African-American umpire to work an All-Star Game.

The pregame ceremonies featured The Lennon Sisters singing the national anthem. The ceremonial first pitches was thrown by Red Ruffing and Lloyd Waner, who were inducted that year into the Baseball Hall Of Fame.

Notes

External links 
 1967 All-Star Game summary @ baseball-almanac.com
 1967 All-Star Game summary @ baseball-reference.com
 1967 All-Star Game box score
 1967 All-Star Game play-by-play

All-Star Game
1967
All-Star Game
Major League Baseball All-Star Game
1967
July 1967 sports events in the United States
1967